René Cornu (11 April 1929 – 23 March 1986) was a French swimmer who competed in the 1948 Summer Olympics.

References

1929 births
1986 deaths
French male freestyle swimmers
Olympic swimmers of France
Swimmers at the 1948 Summer Olympics
Olympic bronze medalists for France
Olympic bronze medalists in swimming
Medalists at the 1948 Summer Olympics
20th-century French people